The 1968 Central Michigan Chippewas football team represented Central Michigan University in the Interstate Intercollegiate Athletic Conference (IIAC) during the 1968 NCAA College Division football season.  In their second season under head coach Roy Kramer, the Chippewas compiled a 7–2 record (2–1 against IIAC opponents), tied for the IIAC championship and outscored their opponents, 256 to 132. The team's statistical leaders included quarterback Bob Miles with 918 passing yards, tailback Craig Tefft with 1,126 rushing yards, and Dave Lemere with 325 receiving yards.  Tefft received the team's most valuable player award.  Seven Central Michigan players (Tefft, defensive end Bucky Colton, guard Fred Ferguson, linebacker Steve Lockman, defensive back Bob Markey, tackle Mike Post, and offensive tackle Ralph Sarnowski) received first-team honors on the All-IIAC team.

Schedule

References

Central Michigan
Central Michigan Chippewas football seasons
Central Michigan Chippewas football
Interstate Intercollegiate Athletic Conference football champion seasons